Kinabalu Jaguar Football Club or KJFC is a Malaysian football club, based in Likas Square Commercial Centre, Kota Kinabalu, Sabah established by Mr. Verdon Bahanda in 2021. This football club currently played in the Malaysia M3 League.

History
The Kinabalu Jaguar Football Club (KJFC) is a football club in Sabah formed by businessman and former footballer of Sabah, Mr. Verdon Bahanda in 2021.

In 2021 after the establishment date of the Kinabalu Jaguar FC, the club's management has designated Likas Square Commercial Centre, Kota Kinabalu, Sabah as the club's central headquarters.

The KJFC logo was designed by Mohd Fazlin Bin Ariffin after won in competition of making the Kinabalu Jaguar FC logo in 2020.

Logo 
(Logo since 2021)

Honours
 Liga Carino-SAFA Bandaraya Kota Kinabalu
Winners (1): 2011–12

Players

First-team squad

Club captains

Head coach

Team managers

Management team

Club personnel
2022 Kinabalu Jaguar Football Club
 Team manager: Adzhar b. Mohamad
 Head coach: Mohd Aiyyman Shah Johny Abdullah
 Assistant Head coach: Sueli Apin
 Assistant coach: Michael Wong @ Jime
 Goal Keeper coach: Dante S Tipay
 Fitness coach: Muhamadin b. Abdul Ajid
 Team Doctor: Firdaus b. Ahmayuddin
 Physiotherapist: Kelvin Chong Han Vui
 Security: Roning b. Mulut
 Kitman: Jamal b. Damin
 Team secretary: David Toru
 Assistant secretary: Clerence George
 Media officer: Hanif b. Ismail

References

External links
 
 

Football clubs in Malaysia
1991 establishments in Malaysia